Deh Kohneh-ye Emamzadeh (also Romanized as Deh Kohneh-ye Emāmzādeh; also known as Deh-e Kohneh) is a village in Sardasht Rural District, in the Central District of Lordegan County, Chaharmahal and Bakhtiari Province, Iran. After the 2006 census, its population was 224, in 34 families. The village is populated by Lurs.

References 

Populated places in Lordegan County
Luri settlements in Chaharmahal and Bakhtiari Province